Safeena Husain is a social worker and founder of Educate Girls – a non-profit organisation that is headquartered in Mumbai, India. It focusses on mobilising communities for girls’ education in India’s rural and educationally backward areas. Under her leadership, Educate Girls’ launched world’s first Development Impact Bond in education which on its completion in 2018 surpassed both its target outcomes.

Recognition & Awards
In 2011, she was elected one of the Asia 21 Young Leaders by the Asia Society. She is a Rainer Arnhold Fellow  and was featured as a speaker at a TEDxASB event on the subject of "Rejuvenating  Government Schools in India for Girls' Education".  She was also featured as a Times Now "Amazing Indian" 
 ET Prime Women Leadership Award 2019
 Winner NITI Aayog Women Transforming India Award 2017
 Winner NDTV-L’Oréal Paris Women of Worth Award 2016
 Winner 2015 Skoll Award for Social Entrepreneurship - April 2015
 Winner of The WISE Award - September 2014
 Rainer Arnhold Fellow - September 2013

References

Indian women educational theorists
Living people
Social workers
Social workers from Delhi
Women educators from Delhi
Educators from Delhi
Year of birth missing (living people)